Felicia Rodrica Sturt Taylor (born August 28, 1964) is a retired American anchor-correspondent who worked for CNN International's World Business Today, and contributed to the Business Updates unit for CNN. She was the co-host of Retirement Living TV's Daily Cafe until November 2009.

Biography
Tayloris the daughter of Australian-born actor Rod Taylor, and his second wife, fashion model Mary Hilem. After her parents divorced, her mother married Chicago real estate developer Arthur Rubloff who adopted Felicia. In 1986, Rubloff died and her mother married Florida real estate developer Lewis M. Schott in 1994. Her stepsister, Victoria (née Schott) de Rothschild, is the second and former wife of British financier Sir Evelyn de Rothschild. A graduate (BA) of Northwestern University, Taylor was a business news anchor and a correspondent for CNBC. Prior to CNBC, she was weekend anchor on WNBC-TV in New York. She joined WNBC in 1998 and left in September 2006. Before WNBC, Taylor worked at the Financial News Network,  Financial Times TV in London.

Personal life
On March 25, 1995, Taylor married Charles Beall Schuster, a bond salesman. They have since divorced.

References

External links 
 

New York (state) television reporters
Television anchors from New York City
American expatriates in the United Kingdom
American television journalists
American people of Australian descent
1964 births
Living people
Northwestern University alumni
American women television journalists
CNBC people
CNN people
Family of Charles Sturt